West Front is a 1998 computer wargame developed and published by TalonSoft. It is the sequel to East Front and the second game in the Campaign series.

In 1999, West Front was followed by East Front II: The Russian Front.

Gameplay
West Front is a computer wargame that simulates conflict during the Western Front of World War II and the North African campaign.

Development
West Front was created with an updated version of the game engine from East Front, its direct predecessor. It is the second entry in TalonSoft's Campaign series.

Reception

According to TalonSoft head Jim Rose, West Front early sales were strong, and were on track to surpass the roughly 90,000 units sold by its predecessor. By February 2000, the overall Campaign series had achieved global sales above 250,000 copies.

The editors of GameSpot nominated West Front for their 1998 "Wargame of the Year" award, which ultimately went to TalonSoft's The Operational Art of War Vol. 1: 1939–1955. They called West Front "much improved" over its "disappointing" predecessor.

Legacy
The second game in the Campaign series, West Front was followed by East Front II: The Russian Front, Rising Sun and Divided Ground: Middle East Conflict 1948–1973.

See also
Western Front: The Liberation of Europe 1944–1945

References

External links
Official page (archived)

1998 video games
Computer wargames
Turn-based strategy video games
Video games about Nazi Germany
Windows games
Windows-only games
World War II video games
Video games developed in the United States
TalonSoft games
Multiplayer and single-player video games